Elvira's Movie Macabre (titled on-screen as Movie Macabre with Elvira, Mistress of the Dark in its original run), or simply Movie Macabre, is an American hosted horror movie television program that originally aired locally from 1981 to 1986. The show features B movies, particularly those in the horror and science fiction genres, and is hosted by Elvira, a character with a black dress and heaven bump hairstyle, played by Cassandra Peterson. Elvira occasionally interrupts the films with comments and jokes, and in some episodes receives phone calls from a character called "the Breather" (John Paragon).

The popularity of the show led to a feature film, Elvira: Mistress of the Dark, which was released in 1988. The character returned in the 2001 film Elvira's Haunted Hills. The show was revived in 2010 as Elvira's Movie Macabre, in which Elvira hosted public domain films. This revival aired on This TV until 2011. Elvira returned as a horror hostess in 2014 with 13 Nights of Elvira, a 13-episode series produced by Hulu. In 2021, she recreated her show for a one-night movie marathon on the streaming service Shudder to celebrate the show's 40th anniversary. The special was called Elvira's 40th Anniversary, Very Scary, Very Special Special.

History

In the late spring of 1981, six years after the death of Larry Vincent (who starred as Sinister Seymour, the host of a local Los Angeles weekend horror show called Fright Night), show producers began the task of bringing the show back. Deciding to use a female host, producers asked 1950s horror hostess Maila Nurmi to revive The Vampira Show. Nurmi worked on the project, helping recreate the sets as they were and the long misty corridor, created scripts in the flavor of those of her 1950s show, and even agreed to her creative intellectual property being used. However, she knew 30 years had passed since she first started playing the character of Vampira and felt she was too old to still play the character herself. Nurmi only agreed to go forward if she could find and tutor the right actress herself. Nurmi had final approval to cast and personally train her as part of their contract agreement, but she had difficulty finding the right actress to be the new Vampira. Producers were getting impatient, and the station sent out a casting call behind Nurmi's back, effectively breaking their own agreement. Peterson auditioned against other horror hostess hopefuls and won the role. She and her best friend, Robert Redding, came up with the sexy punk/Vampira variant of the original Vampira dress. 

The day of the first taping, producers were still using the name Vampira. Nurmi got word about what they were up to from a friend that worked at the studio and had the producers and Peterson delivered a cease and desist letter from Nurmi about mid-day. They broke early for a long lunch and basically the only thing they changed before coming back from their lunch break was the name of the character / show. The sets (similar to Vampira's 1950s originals), show format, even the scripts stayed nearly exactly the same. Rumors persist producers rejected a suggestion from Peterson to change the character to look look like Sharon Tate in The Fearless Vampire Killers but no credible proof has ever been shown to bolster this. Except for the omission of Vampira's pet spider Rollo, yet another holdover from the original 1950s show (but one too on the nose to get away with legally had they tried to keep it), the only thing that was changed was the name of the character and the way she was played. The song Valley Girl by Moon Unit Zappa was very trendy and popular at the time, so that type of stereotypical character would be much less likely to have adverse legal repercussions. Besides the similarities in the format and costumes, Elvira's closing line for each show, wishing her audience "Unpleasant dreams", was notably similar to Vampira's: "Bad dreams, darlings..." uttered as she walked off down a long misty corridor. Right before the court case, Nurmi's lawyer, abruptly quit the case without giving a reason, keeping all evidence and case paperwork that had been collected and prepared. With no way to get to the court house in downtown Los Angeles from Hollywood (Nurmi did not drive and her lawyer was to supply transportation to court), Nurmi was unable to make it to the courthouse on time. The judge in the case had no other recourse than to issue a default judgment in favor of Peterson and the producers. So, though urban legend has been perpetuated over the years that it was only about the color of a dress, a wig, and a similar shtick, the case was more specific. Since they were unable to continue with the Vampira name, Elvira was used instead. What followed was Elvira's Movie Macabre, featuring a Valley-girl-type character named Elvira, Mistress of the Dark, with heavily applied, pancake-horror make-up and a towering black beehive wig.

The Elvira character rapidly gained notoriety with her tight-fitting, low-cut black gown which showed ample cleavage (after all, Vampira had only been broadcast locally back in the day and Elvira was syndicated much wider). The movies featured on Elvira's Movie Macabre were always B-grade (or lower). Elvira reclined on a red Victorian couch, introducing and often interrupting the movie to lampoon the actors, the script, and the editing. Adopting the flippant tone of a California "Valley girl", she brought a satirical, sarcastic edge to her commentary. She reveled in dropping risqué double entendres and making frequent jokes about her display of cleavage, which was after all most of a not very bright bimbo's personality. In an AOL Entertainment News interview, Peterson said, "I figured out that Elvira is me when I was a teenager. She's a spastic girl. I just say what I feel and people seem to enjoy it." Her campy humor, sex appeal, and good-natured self-mockery made her popular with late night movie viewers, and her popularity soared.

Elvira was a frequent guest on The Tonight Show Starring Johnny Carson and other talk shows. She also produced a long-running series of Halloween-themed television commercials for Coors Light Beer and Mug Root Beer (her trademark cleavage was concealed for the Coors campaign). She appeared in guest roles on television dramas such as CHiPs, The Fall Guy and Fantasy Island and appeared on numerous awards shows as a presenter. Although she is known primarily as Elvira, Peterson has made out-of-costume appearances as herself for television interviews and specials.

In 1982, with the success of Movie Macabre, Knott's Theme Parks hired Elvira to replace Seymour as the host of its annual Halloween Haunt during October. Elvira appeared nightly at the park, live on stage with a Halloween-themed musical comedy revue similar to her Mamma's Boys act from the 1970s.

The Elvira character rapidly evolved from obscure cult figure to a lucrative brand name and "Mistress of all Media", spawning many products throughout the 1980s and 1990s, including Halloween costumes, comic books, action figures, trading cards, pinball machines, Halloween decor, model kits, calendars, perfume and dolls. She has appeared on the cover of Femme Fatales magazine five times. Her popularity reached its zenith with the release of the feature film Elvira, Mistress of the Dark (co-written by Peterson) (1988).

Episode list

Season 1

Season 2

Season 3

Season 4

Season 5

Revivals

Midnight Madness (1990s)
In the 1990s, Rhino Home Video released Midnight Madness, a collection of films hosted by Elvira, on VHS.

 Eegah
 Frankenstein's Daughter
 Killers from Space
 The Giant Gila Monster
 The Mask
 She Demons
 Night of the Ghouls
 I Eat Your Skin
 The Brain That Wouldn't Die
 The Brain from Planet Arous
 A Bucket of Blood
 The Crawling Hand
 The Wasp Woman
 The Hideous Sun Demon
 Missile to the Moon

Elvira's Movie Macabre (2010–11)

In September 2010, Elvira's Movie Macabre returned to television syndication in the United States, airing on This TV. This revival saw Elvira hosting public domain films. 26 episodes were produced; six were left unaired, but were released on both DVD and iTunes.

13 Nights of Elvira (2014)
13 Nights of Elvira was produced for Hulu by Brainstorm Media. A new episode streamed each day through Halloween. The series teamed with film distributor Full Moon Features; it provided the majority of the films chosen for the series.

Elvira's 40th Anniversary, Very Scary, Very Special Special (2021)
To celebrate the original show's 40th anniversary, Cassandra Peterson revived her role for a special one-night movie marathon, which premiered live on Shudder, the horror streaming service. The special came out on September 25, 2021, the same week as her memoir, Yours Cruelly, Elvira.

DVD releases

Time Life
In 2004, Time Life released a series of special Elvira DVDs titled Elvira's Horror Classics, which was done in a similar fashion to Movie Macabre. There were seven films total in the series. There was a 3-DVD box set for six of the seven films titled Elvira's Box of Horrors. This box set consists of three double feature DVDs. The films featured were all in the public domain. They included:

 The Little Shop of Horror and The Brain That Wouldn't Die 
 Dementia 13 and Carnival of Souls
 House on Haunted Hill and Night of the Living Dead

The films were also released on four stand-alone DVDs. Three of the four DVDs were double features under the Elvira's Horror Classics title. Night Of The Living Dead was a single feature DVD without the Elvira's Horror Classics title branding on the DVD case art. It was titled as Night of the Living Dead "Hosted by Elvira". The disc itself does have the Elvira's Horror Classics branding on it. 

 The Little Shop of Horrors and The Brain That Wouldn't Die 
 Dementia 13 and Carnival of Souls
 House on Haunted Hill and The Terror
 Night of the Living Dead

Shout! Factory
Shout! Factory has released a small number of Movie Macabre episodes to DVD, in both single and double feature format. The DVDs allow the material to be shown either complete with Elvira's interruptions or uninterrupted. Unlike the original broadcasts, the films are complete and uncensored.

Single DVDs
 Frankenstein's Castle of Freaks
 Count Dracula's Great Love
 Legacy of Blood
 The Devil's Wedding Night
 The Doomsday Machine
 The Werewolf of Washington

Double feature DVDs
 Blue Sunshine and Monstroid
 Gamera: Super Monster and They Came from Beyond Space
 Maneater of Hydra and The House That Screamed
 Count Dracula's Great Love and Frankenstein's Castle of Freaks
 Legacy of Blood and The Devil's Wedding Night
 The Doomsday Machine and The Werewolf of Washington

E1 Entertainment
Following the revival of Elvira's Movie Macabre in 2011, E1 Entertainment began releasing episodes of the new series on DVD. Unlike the Shout! Factory editions, these films were released in their edited format as aired in syndication.

Single DVDs
 The Satanic Rites of Dracula
 I Eat Your Skin
 Night of the Living Dead
 The Brain That Wouldn't Die
 Santa Claus Conquers the Martians
 Beast from Haunted Cave (previously unaired)
 The Terror
 Hercules and the Captive Women
 The Wasp Woman (previously unaired)
 The Wild Women of Wongo (previously unaired) 
 Untamed Women

Double feature DVDs
 Night of the Living Dead and I Eat Your Skin
 Satanic Rites of Dracula and The Werewolf of Washington
 The Terror and Eegah
 The Brain That Wouldn't Die and The Manster
 Scared to Death and Tormented
 Lady Frankenstein and Jesse James Meets Frankenstein's Daughter
 Santa Claus Conquers the Martians and Beast from Haunted Cave (previously unaired)

Quadruple feature sets
 Wild Women featuring Untamed Women, The Wild Women of Wongo (previously unaired), Hercules and the Captive Women and The Wasp Woman (previously unaired)
 Giant Monsters featuring The Giant Gila Monster, Attack of the Giant Leeches (previously unaired), Teenagers from Outer Space, and Monster from a Prehistoric Planet (previously unaired) 
 Bloody Madness featuring A Bucket of Blood, The Killer Shrews (previously unaired), Manos: The Hands of Fate and Don't Look in the Basement

See also
 List of films in the public domain in the United States
 List of Cinema Insomnia episodes
 List of Mystery Science Theater 3000 episodes

References

External links
 
 
 
 
 Elvira's Movie Macabre E1 Entertainment releases via TVShowsOnDVD.com

Elvira, Mistress of the Dark
American motion picture television series
Horror movie television series
1981 American television series debuts
1986 American television series endings
Television shows adapted into comics
Television shows adapted into films
Television shows adapted into video games
Hulu original programming
Shudder (streaming service) original programming